The 7th Infantry Division is a war-formed infantry division, part of the British Indian  Army that saw service in the Burma Campaign.

History
The division was created on 1 October 1940 at Attock, under the command of Major General Arthur Wakely. Its formation sign was an arrow, pointing bottom left to top right, in yellow on a black background. The division was sometimes known as the "Golden Arrow" division from this sign. When first formed, the division consisted of the 13th, 14th and 16th Indian Infantry Brigades, but within eighteen months, both the 13th and 16th Brigades were removed and dispatched to Burma, where both fought during the Japanese conquest of Burma. The 14th Brigade was renumbered the 114th Indian Infantry Brigade and remained with the division.

During 1942, the 33rd and 89th Brigades were added to the division. The division trained for operations in the deserts in the Middle East but by the end of the year, the North African campaign was clearly at an end. In early 1943, the division was reassigned to the Burma campaign and Major General Frank Messervy, a veteran of the fighting in North Africa, was appointed to command, replacing Major General Thomas Corbett.

After extensive retraining and preparation, 7th Division took part in an offensive in Arakan, the coastal province of Burma. Starting in December 1943, the division advanced down the Kalapanzin River valley as part of XV Corps. In February 1944, Japanese troops infiltrated through the division's front and overran the divisional HQ. Units of the division took part in the subsequent Battle of the Admin Box, in which the Japanese failed to capture positions supplied by parachute drops and were forced to retreat.

During March, the Japanese launched a major offensive (codenamed Operation U-Go) into Manipur. Having been withdrawn from the Arakan battles, the division proceeded by road and rail to Dimapur, where it came under command of XXXIII Corps and took part in the Battle of Kohima. The 161st Indian Brigade, part of the 5th Indian Division, came under command, while the 89th Brigade was flown to Imphal, to replace 161st Brigade in 5th Division. During early May, 33rd Brigade completed the recapture of Kohima Ridge, while the main body of the division recaptured Naga Village to the north of the ridge. During the later part of the month and early June, the division advanced through heavy monsoon rains along rough tracks to the east of the main road from Kohima to Imphal, and cleared Japanese stragglers from Ukhrul.

From July to October, the division regrouped near Kohima, and 89th Brigade rejoined. Late in 1944, Major General Messervy was promoted to command IV Corps and was replaced in command of the division by Major General Geoffrey Charles Evans. Now commanded by IV Corps, the division advanced down the Gangaw Valley west of the Chindwin River, with the 28th (East Africa) Brigade under command, screened until Pauk was reached by the lightly equipped Lushai Brigade. During late February 1945, the division captured vital bridgeheads across the Irrawaddy River near Pakokku. During March, as part of the decisive Battle of Central Burma, the division was involved in several battles at Myingyan and Yenangyaung.

During April, the division once again came under command of XXXIII Corps and advanced down the west bank of the Irrawaddy. After Rangoon, the capital, was captured in early May, the division was directly commanded by the new headquarters of Twelfth Army and resisted Japanese diversionary attacks across the Sittang River during the monsoon.

After the war ended, in September 1945, the division moved to Thailand, where it disarmed the Japanese occupying army, and liberated and repatriated Allied prisoners of war.

Following the Partition of India in 1947 the 7th Division local units were split between India and Pakistan, and both armies continue to have a 7th Infantry Division with the Golden Arrow formation sign.

Component Units (1 March 1944)
 33rd Indian Infantry Brigade
 1st Battalion, Queen's Royal Regiment (West Surrey)
 4th Battalion, 15th Punjab Regiment
 4th Battalion, 1st Gurkha Rifles
 89th Indian Infantry Brigade
 2nd Battalion, King's Own Scottish Borderers
 7th Battalion, 2nd Punjab Regiment
 4th Battalion, 8th Gurkha Rifles
 114th Indian Infantry Brigade
 1st Battalion, Somerset Light Infantry
 4th Battalion, 14th Punjab Regiment
 4th Battalion, 5th Royal Gurkha Rifles

Support Units
 1st Battalion, 11th Sikh Regiment (Machine-gun unit)
 136th (1st West Lancashire) Field Regt, Royal Artillery
 139th (4th London) Field Regt, Royal Artillery
 25th Mountain Regt. Indian Artillery
 24th Light Anti-Aircraft / Anti-Tank Regt, Royal Artillery
 62nd Field Company Royal Indian Engineers (IE)
 77th Field Company IE
 421st Field Company IE
 303rd Field Park Company IE

Commanders
 Maj. Gen. A.V.T. Wakely
 Maj. Gen. R. Richardson
 Maj. Gen. Thomas Corbett
 Maj. Gen. Frank Messervy
 Maj. Gen. Geoffrey Evans
 Maj. Gen. Frederick Joseph Loftus-Tottenham

Assigned brigades
All these brigades were assigned or attached to the division at some time during World War II.
 55th Indian Infantry Brigade
 9th Indian Infantry Brigade
 28th (East African) Infantry Brigade
 268th Indian Infantry Brigade
 22nd (East African) Infantry Brigade

References

Bibliography

External links

Further reading
 Jon Latimer, Burma: The Forgotten War, London: John Murray, 2004 
 Michael Roberts, Golden Arrow: the story of the 7th Indian Division in the Second World War, 1939-1945, 1952

Indian World War II divisions
British Indian Army divisions
Divisions of the Indian Army
Military units and formations established in 1940
D
Military units and formations disestablished in 1947